Abū Saʿīd Saʿd ibn Mālik ibn Sinān al-Khazrajī al-Khudrī was an inhabitant of Medina and early ally (Ansari) of the Islamic prophet Muhammad and one of the younger "companions of the prophet". Too young to fight at the Battle of Uhud in 625 where his father Malik ibn Sinan fell, he participated in subsequent campaigns. Although he traveled to Syria once to visit the Umayyad caliph Mu'awiyah, he resided in Medina all his life. Later, he is said to have participated with his fellow Medinans in the defense of their city against the Umayyad army at the Battle of al-Harrah in 64/683. He is said variously to have died in 63/682, 64/683, 65/684, or 74/693. Abu Said is one of the narrators of hadith most frequently quoted. By one count, he has 1170 narrations, making him the seventh most prolific Companion in the transmission of the hadith.

Shia Muslims do not automatically dismiss his narrations but compare what he narrates with other sources.

Hadith transmitted by him
The following quotations are from books of hadith. These books relate accounts taken from the life of the Islamic prophet Muhammad, his family, and his companions. They were compiled by Islamic scholars after Muhammad's death. These quotations include information about those who related the accounts, as well as the accounts themselves.

Abu Sa'id al-Khudri narrates that Muhammad said, "He who fasts for a day in the Path of Allah, Allah will keep him away from Hell by a distance of seventy years of journey." from 

Abu Saeed al Khudri reported that he heard Muhammad say, "While I was asleep, I dreamt that people are brought to me, all of them wearing shirts. Some of the shirts reached only up to the chest and some a little below the chest. Umar ibn al-Khattab was also brought to me. His shirt was so long that it trailed on the ground and he dragged it along as he walked." Some of the sahaba asked him its interpretation and he said, "Religion." from Sahih Bukhari and Muslim

Narrations 
 A narration concerning An-Nisa, 24
 A narration concerning Contraception

See also
Sunni view of the Sahaba
Salat
Wudhu
Dhikr
Quran

Notes

610s births
690s deaths
7th-century deaths
Sahabah hadith narrators